Glenhuntly tram depot is located on Glen Huntly Road, Caulfield South, a suburb of Melbourne, Australia. Operated by Yarra Trams, it is one of eight tram depots on the Melbourne tram network.

History
Glenhuntly tram depot opened in 1923 and is one of eight depots on the Yarra Trams network.

When the Public Transport Corporation was privatised in August 1999, Glenhuntly depot passed to M>Tram. It passed to Yarra Trams when it took control of the entire tram network in April 2004.

Layout
The main yard has 12 roads, six of these inside a maintenance shed. A single, double-track entrance exists, one for trams entering the depot and the other for trams leaving the depot.

Rolling stock
, the depot had an allocation of 49 trams: 4 A1 Class, 26 B2 Class and 19 Z3 Class.

Routes
The following routes are operated from Glenhuntly depot:
3: Melbourne University to Malvern East (weekdays)
3a: Melbourne University to Malvern East via St Kilda (weekends & public holidays)
64: Melbourne University to Brighton East
67: Melbourne University to Carnegie
Until 30 April 2017 Route 78 was operated from Glenhuntly Depot when it was transferred back to Kew tram depot to allow more B2 class trams to be operated from here.

References

Tram depots in Melbourne
Transport infrastructure completed in 1923
1923 establishments in Australia
Buildings and structures in the City of Glen Eira
Transport in the City of Glen Eira